Mountain research or montology, traditionally also known as orology (from Greek oros ὄρος for 'mountain' and logos λόγος), is a field of research that regionally concentrates on the Earth's surface's part covered by mountain environments.

Mountain areas
Different approaches have been developed to define mountainous areas. While some use an altitudinal difference of 300 m inside an area to define that zone as mountainous, others consider differences from 1000 m or more, depending on the areas' latitude. Additionally, some include steepness to define mountain regions, hence excluding high plateaus (e.g. the Andean Altiplano or the Tibetan Plateau), zones often seen to be mountainous. A more pragmatic but useful definition has been proposed by the Italian Statistics Office ISTAT, which classifies municipalities as mountainous

 if at least 80% of their territory is situated above ≥ 600 m above sea level, and/or 
 if they have an altitudinal difference of 600 m (or more) within their administrative boundaries.

The United Nations Environmental Programme has produced a map of mountain areas worldwide using a combination of criteria, including regions with

 elevations from 300 to 1000 m and local elevation range > 300 m;
 elevations from 1000 to 1500 m and slope ≥ 5° or local elevation range > 300 m;
 elevations from 1500 to 2500 m and slope ≥ 2°;
 elevations of 2500 m or more.

Focus

Broader definition
In a broader sense, mountain research is considered any research in mountain regions: for instance disciplinary studies on Himalayan plants, Andean rocks, Alpine cities, or Carpathian people. It is comparable to research that concentrates on the Arctic and Antarctic (polar research) or coasts (coastal research).

Narrower definition
In a narrower sense, mountain research focuses on mountain regions, their description and the explanation of the human-environment interaction in (positive) and the sustainable development of (normative) these areas. So-defined mountain research is situated at the nexus of natural sciences, social sciences and humanities. Drawing on Alexander von Humboldt's work in the Andean realm, mountain geography and ecology are considered core areas of study; nevertheless important contributions are coming from anthropology, geology, economics, history or spatial planning. In sum, a narrowly defined mountain research applies an interdisciplinary and integrative regional approach. Slaymaker summarizes:

Denomination
Mountain research or orology—not to be confused with orography—, is sometimes denominated montology. This term stems from Carl Troll's mountain geoecology—geoecology being Troll's English translation of the German Landschaftsökologie—and appeared at a meeting in Cambridge, Massachusetts in 1977. Since then, scholars such as Jack D. Ives, Bruno Messerli and Robert E. Rhoades have claimed the development of montology as interdisciplinary mountain research. The term montology was included in the Oxford English Dictionary in 2002. It defines montology as:

On the one hand, the term montology received criticism due to the mix of Latin (mōns, pl. montēs) and Greek (logos). On the other hand, however, this is also the—well accepted—case in several, already established disciplines such as glaciology or sociology.

Mountain research journals
The following list includes peer-reviewed journals that have a focus on mountain research and are open to both the natural and the social sciences:

Mountain research personalities

See also
 Mountain Research and Development
 Journal of Mountain Science
 eco.mont – Journal on Protected Mountain Areas Research and Management
 Mountain Partnership

References

Further reading

External links 
 MRI Mountain Research Initiative
 The Mountain Forum
 AAG Mountain Geography Specialty Group

Area studies
Geography
Ecology
Mountains